In mechanism design, a branch of economics, a budget-feasible mechanism is a mechanism in which the total payment made by the auctioneer is upper-bounded by a fixed pre-specified budget. They were first presented by Yaron Singer, and studied by several others.

References 

Mechanism design
Auction theory